Florence P. Sullivan (1862 – February 8, 1897), was an American professional baseball player who played pitcher in Major League Baseball for the Pittsburgh Alleghenys in . Sullivan has the record for most strikeouts in a career that lasted only one season, with 189.

External links

1862 births
1897 deaths
Major League Baseball pitchers
Pittsburgh Alleghenys players
19th-century baseball players
Springfield, Illinois (minor league baseball) players
Macon (minor league baseball) players
Kansas City Cowboys (minor league) players
Baseball players from Illinois
Sportspeople from East St. Louis, Illinois
Deaths by firearm in Illinois